María García may refer to:

 María García (canoeist) (born 1978), Spanish sprint canoer
 Maria Garcia (speed skater) (born 1985), American Olympic speed skater
 María Esther García (born 1954), Cuban fencer
 María Fernanda García, Mexican actress
 María García (judoka) (born 1987), Dominican Republican judoka
 María Julia Mantilla (María Julia Mantilla García, born 1984), Peruvian beauty queen
 Maria Malibran (María Felicia García Sitches, 1808–1836), opera singer
 Maria Carmen Garcia (born 1990), Spanish water polo player
 María García (photographer) (born 1936), Mexican photographer and photojournalist
 María Inés García (born 1964), Colombian dressage rider
 Maria Cristina Garcia (born 1960), American historian
 María Yvett García (born 1996), Dominican volleyball player
 María Luisa García (1919–2019), Spanish Asturian chef and cookbook author